The Tianlongshan Grottoes (Chinese: 天龙山石窟, pinyin: Tiānlóngshān Shíkū, English translation: Mountain of the Heavenly Dragon) are caves located in Taiyuan, Shanxi Province, China, that are notable for the Buddhist temples located within them. The temple complex spans two mountains: there are eight grottoes on the eastern mountain and 13 on the western mountain. The complex was constructed over a number of centuries, from the northern Qi dynasty until the Tang dynasty, and contains Buddhist art of high historic importance. The majority of the caves date to the Tang dynasty. The caves have been designated by the government as a Major Historical and Cultural Site Protected at the National Level.

Artwork
A number of works of Buddhist sculpture survived in the caves, including over 1,500 statues and 1,144 reliefs sculptures. Many of the sculptures are of painted stone. The subject matter includes images of Buddha and bodhisattvas. The caves' Tang sculptures are noted for their soft modeling, sensuous drapery, and naturalism. A connection to the Gandhara style of Buddhist sculpture has been proposed.

Similarities with Central Asian Buddhist styles
The Buddhist art of Central Asia, particularly the area of Afghanistan, in the 7th-8th century CE shows a phase using "Sinicized Indian models". During this period, the Chinese Tang Empire extended its influence and promotion of Buddhism to the Kingdom of Central Asia, with a corresponding influx of Chinese monks, while there was conversely a migration of Indian monks from India to Central Asia, precisely looking for this protection. These events gave rise to the hybrid styles of Fondukistan and of the second artistic phase of Tapa Sardar in Afghanistan. This style is part of a cosmopolitan artistic idiom which spread from China to Central Asia at the time, with similarities visible for example in the Tang productions of Tianlongshan.

Removal of the sculptures
In the 1920s, a number of the sculptures were removed and sold to collectors abroad. In particular, the publication by Japanese art dealer Yamanaka Sadajirō of a book on the caves' contents led to a sharp increase in collector interest. For this reason, many sculptures originating from Tianlongshan are currently housed in foreign museums.

Sculpture digitization
The Tianlongshan Grottoes exist today in a damaged state in Taiyuan with so many of the sculptures now missing, that visitors to the caves cannot imagine how they looked in the past. Many of the sculptures from the caves are now in museums around the world. Researchers at the University of Chicago initiated the Tianlongshan Caves Project in 2013 to pursue research and digital imaging of the caves and their sculptures. The Project seeks to record and archive the sculptures and to compile data that can identify the fragments and their places of origin.

Gallery

See also
Dunhuang Caves
Major national historical and cultural sites (Shanxi)
Rock-cut architecture

References

Buddhist architecture in Taiyuan
Chinese Buddhist grottoes
Major National Historical and Cultural Sites in Shanxi
Taiyuan